Kevin Murray was an Irish soccer player during the 1960s.

Murray was an inside-right player who played for Bohemian and Dundalk amongst others during his career in the League of Ireland.
He played for Bohs for two seasons (42 league appearances with 15 goals) before joining Dundalk in 1966 where he won a league winners medal.
He earned the nickname "the man with three lungs," and played for Ireland with Amateur status. 
Murray played against Liverpool and Manchester United and scored a penalty at Ibrox against Glasgow Rangers. He also played in the former European Cup against opposition from England, Scotland, Hungary and the Netherlands.

Honours
League of Ireland
 Dundalk - 1966/67
LFA President's Cup
 Bohemians -1965/66

References

League of Ireland players
Bohemian F.C. players
Dundalk F.C. players
Republic of Ireland association footballers
Year of birth missing
Possibly living people
Association footballers not categorized by position